The Arrow Collar Man was the name given to the various male models who appeared in advertisements for shirts and detachable shirt collars manufactured by Cluett Peabody & Company of Troy, New York. The original campaign ran from 1905–31, though the company continued to refer to men in its ads and its consumers as "Arrow men" much later.

The Arrow Collar ads were a collaborative production of New York ad agency Calkins and Holden; Cluett, Peabody advertising director Charles Connolly; and commercial illustrator J. C. Leyendecker. One of Leyendecker's models was his partner, a Canadian named Charles Beach. Another model was a young Huntley Gordon. According to Leyendecker himself, there were six men besides Beach who posed for the Arrow Collar ads: Jack Mulhall, Neil Hamilton, Robert Allen, Brian Donlevy, Mahlon Hamilton, and Reed Howes.

Hundreds of printed advertisements were produced from 1907 to 1931 featuring the Arrow Collar Man. The fictional Arrow collar man became an icon and by 1920 was receiving fan mail. Fans would cut their favorite collar men out of advertisements and hang them on their wall. He inspired a Broadway musical Helen of Troy in 1923.

In 2004, the Arrow brand was acquired by longtime competitor Philips-Van Heusen, owner of the Van Heusen brand. Under PVH, the Arrow brand was positioned as a slightly less expensive complement to the Van Heusen brand.

On June 23, 2021, it was announced that the Arrow brand would be sold to Authentic Brands Group alongside Van Heusen, Izod, and Geoffrey Beene. The sale was completed on August 2, 2021, with United Legwear & Apparel Company named as its licensee.

Today, the Arrow (officially stylized as ARROW) trademark is owned by Authentic Brands Group and is manufactured and marketed by United Legwear & Apparel Company under a long-term licensing agreement. Currently in the United States, the primary retailer for the brand is online retailer Amazon.com. The brand was formerly sold by Sears, JCPenney, and Kohl's.

Attached collars 
In the early 1920s, Cluett, Peabody & Co. began manufacturing their shirts with attached collars in response to consumer demand and became the most successful company in the U.S. at that time. Their sales increased to 4 million collars a week and Arrow shirts with attached collars were being exported to foreign ports such as Batavia (Jakarta) and the Belgian Congo. The Arrow Collar Man campaign ended in 1930, having been one of the most successful advertising campaigns in history.

In popular culture 
 Lyrics from Irving Berlin song "Puttin' on the Ritz" include the line "High hats and Arrow collars..." in the second verse, 1946 version.
 Cole Porter referred to "Arrow Collars" in his song: "You're The Top" from the 1934 musical Anything Goes.
 Lyrics sung by Julie in F.S. Fitzgerald's comic one-act play "Porcelain and Pink" from the 1922 short story collection Tales of the Jazz Age include the lines "When the Arrow-collar man / Meets the D'jer-Kiss girl".
 In Season 2 Episode 9 of 30 Rock, Jack Donaghy is described by Liz Lemon's father as "looking like an Arrow Shirt Model" after he's stunned by Jack's appearance.

References

Further reading

External links 
 PVH Heritage Brands
 Arrow
 Bookrags Arrow Man

Fictional models
Tops (clothing)
Neckwear
Authentic Brands Group
2021 mergers and acquisitions